Spheterista urerana is a moth of the family Tortricidae. It was first described by Otto Swezey in 1915. It is endemic to the Hawaiian island of Oahu.

The larvae feed on Urera sandvicensis. They bore in the twigs of their host plant, near growing tips of new shoots. Full-grown larvae are about 12 mm long and pale greenish.

The pupa is about 7 mm long and pale yellowish brown. It is enclosed in a cocoon made by the rolled-over edge of a dead leaf.

External links

Archipini
Endemic moths of Hawaii